Brest may refer to:

Places
Brest, Belarus
Brest Region
Brest Airport
Brest Fortress
Brest, Kyustendil Province, Bulgaria
Břest, Czech Republic
Brest, France
Arrondissement of Brest
Brest Bretagne Airport
 Château de Brest
Brest, Germany
Brest, Čučer-Sandevo, North Macedonia
Brest, Makedonski Brod, North Macedonia
Brest, Štip Municipality, North Macedonia
Brest (Merošina), Serbia
Brest, Ig, Slovenia
Brest, Michigan, a former community

Other uses
 Brest (surname), including a list of people with the name
 3232 Brest, an asteroid
 BREST (reactor), a Russian nuclear reactor

See also
 
 Breast (disambiguation)
 Brześć (disambiguation)